Roger Miller (20 April 1857 – 13 July 1912) was an English first-class cricketer.

The son of William Miller, he was born at Reading in April 1857. He was educated at both Somerset College in Bath and Uppingham School, before going up to Jesus College, Cambridge. While studying at Cambridge, he played first-class cricket for Cambridge University Cricket Club in 1881, playing two matches against an England XI and the Gentlemen of England, with both matches played at Fenner's. He scored 62 runs in these two matches, but did not gain a cricket blue. Miller also played first-class matches for the Marylebone Cricket Club between 1881 and 1884, making five appearances. He scored 199 runs in these matches, with a highest score of 73 on his debut for the club in 1881 against Cambridge University. Miller died at Lowestoft in July 1912.

References

External links

1857 births
1912 deaths
sportspeople from Reading, Berkshire
People educated at Uppingham School
Alumni of Jesus College, Cambridge
English cricketers
Cambridge University cricketers
Marylebone Cricket Club cricketers